Elphin of Warrington (died 679) was a Christian saint who lived in the North West of England in the 7th century, and is considered the patron saint of the town of Warrington.

Life
Little is known about his life, but according to tradition he was a companion of Saint Oswald at Iona. When Oswald became king of Northumbria and moved his country residence to Makerfield, Elphin accompanied him and Oswald built a wooden church for him on the site of the present parish church in Warrington. The Domesday Book also describes two carucates of land in the Hundred of Newton-in-Makerfield as belonging to St Elphin. He was martyred in 679.

Dedications

St Elphin's Church, Warrington, known for its 281-foot spire, is dedicated to St Elphin. Also dedicated to him was St Elphin's School, a boarding school founded in Warrington that moved to Darley Dale, Derbyshire; it closed in 2005.

References

Elphin
Elphin